Atherigona simplex, the kodo millet shoot fly, is a species of fly in the family Muscidae. It is found in South Asia.

References

Muscidae
Insect pests of millets